Wadad Makdisi Cortas (1909 — 1979) (in Arabic "وداد مقدسي قرطاس") was a Lebanese-Palestinian educator and memoirist.

Early life
Wadad Makdisi grew up in an educated family in Beirut, and attended Ahliah National School for Girls as a child.

Career
Cortas worked at her alma mater, the Ahliah National School for Girls, for forty years, as a teacher and then for 26 years as principal, before she retired in 1972. She also taught at Beirut College for Women, and was on the board of the Academie Libanaise des Beaux Arts.

Cortas's memoir, Dunia Ahbab-tuha (A World I Loved) was published in Arabic in the 1960s. She translated the memoir into English and updated it in her retirement; the revised version was published posthumously, with a foreword by Nadine Gordimer, in 2009. In 2012, a stage adaptation of Cortas's book, starring Vanessa Redgrave, was produced first at the Brighton Festival, then at Columbia University, and in 2015 at the Spoleto Festival in Italy.

Personal life
Cortas married a businessman from Brummana, Emile Cortas. They had four children, including Mariam C. Said. Cortas had a stroke in 1972 with lasting effects; she died in 1979, aged 70 years. Her granddaughter Najla Said is an actress and playwright in New York City.

References

1909 births
1979 deaths
Lebanese writers
20th-century Lebanese women writers
Lebanese women memoirists